The 1950 Illinois State Normal Redbirds football team represented Illinois State Normal University—now known as Illinois State University—as a member of the Interstate Intercollegiate Athletic Conference (IIAC) during the 1950 college football season. Led by sixth-year head coach Edwin Struck, the Redbirds compiled an overall record of 7–1–2 with a mark of 5–0–1 in conference play, winning the IIAC. The team played home games at McCormick Field in Normal, Illinois.

Schedule

References

Illinois State Normal
Illinois State Redbirds football seasons
Interstate Intercollegiate Athletic Conference football champion seasons
Illinois State Normal Redbirds football